Events of 2019 in Turkey.

Incumbents
President: Recep Tayyip Erdoğan
Speaker of the Grand National Assembly: Binali Yıldırım (until 19 February)
Speaker of the Grand National Assembly: Mustafa Şentop (from 24 February)

Events

February 
 6 February - An 8-storey building in Kartal collapsed killing, 8 people and injuring 14 others.
 10 February - The grand breaking ceremony for the Atatürk Cultural Center was held in the place of the previously demolished building.
 11 February - A UH-1 military helicopter crashed in Çekmeköy, killing 4 soldiers. On 26 November 2018, the same type of helicopter had departed this location and fell of around Sancaktepe.
 13 February - In a call for tinder organized for İddaa, Şans Venture Partnership won the tender.
 18 February - The Speaker of the Grand National Assembly, Binali Yıldırım, resigns from his post to become a candidate for the Mayor-ship of the Istanbul Metropolitan Municipality at the local elections. He was temporarily succeeded by the Deputy Speaker Celal Adan.
 24 February - By winning 336 votes, Mustafa Şentop is elected as the new Speaker of the Grand National Assembly.
 25 February - Turkish scientists established a temporarily base in Antarctica.
 25 February - Emlak Kredi Bank, which had become defunct in 2001, is reopened under the name Emlak Katılım Bank following an announcement in the Official Gazette.

March 
 7 March - Çamlıca Mosque is opened on the day corresponding to the Night of Wishes.
 12 March - Gebze-Halkalı Commuter train line was opened as the second phase of Marmaray expansions. Expeditions were stopped in 2013 for the renewal of suburban lines.
 31 March - Local elections took place across the country. Ekrem İmamoğlu says he won Istanbul's mayoral election by 29,000 votes, although the country's ruling party says they garnered 48.70% of the votes compared to only 48.65% for İmamoğlu. Binali Yıldırım claims he received 48.71% of the votes and claims victory.

June 
 23 June - June 2019 Istanbul mayoral election took place. Ekrem İmamoğlu was elected as the new mayor.

August 
 8 August - A 6-magnitude earthquake occurred in Bozkurt, Denizli. There was no loss of life during this earthquake.
 19 August - Diyarbakır, Van and Mardin Metropolitan mayors were removed from their posts and temporarily replaced by trustees.

September 
 16 September - Turkish, Russian and Iranian leaders met during a summit on Syria in Ankara.
 17 September - Teknofest 2019 started, lasting for a week.
 26 September - A 5.8 magnitude earthquake occurred offshore the Sea of Marmara in Silivri, Istanbul.
 26 September - Anadolu Efes S.K. defeated Fenerbahçe Basketball in the finale for the Turkish Basketball Presidential Cup, winning the cup for the 12th time.

October
 9 October — Rojava offensive.

December 
 27 December - TOGG Turkish national car is introduced to the public.

Deaths
 4 January – Turhan Erdoğan, Turkish academic in civil engineering (born 1938)
 23 January – Ayşen Gruda, Turkish actress and comedian (born 1944)
 3 February – Turgut Uçar, Turkish football manager and coach (born 1964)
 19 February - Abdullah Çevrim, Turkish football player (born 1941)
 26 February – Aytaç Arman, Turkish actor (born 1949)
 8 March – Mesrob II Mutafyan of Constantinople, the 84th Armenian Patriarch of Constantinople (born 1956) 
 13 March – Beril Dedeoğlu, Turkish academic and politician (born 1961) 
 5 May – Kadir Mısıroğlu, Turkish writer and publisher (born 1933)
 28 July – Ferruh Bozbeyli, Turkish politician (born 1927) 
 15 October – Orhan Birgit, lawyer and politician (born 1927) 
 20 November – F. Tulga Ocak, academic (born 1946)
 16 December – Sevim Tekeli, academic (born 1924)

References

 
2010s in Turkey
Years of the 21st century in Turkey
Turkey
Turkey
Turkey